Topanga is the fourth solo album by Scottish-Australian singer Colin Hay, released in 1994. It was the first released on his own label Lazy Eye Records. 

According to Australian musicologist, Ian McFarlane, it "sold well in Canada, Germany and Brazil. In July, Hay set off on his solo Man at Work Australian tour."

Track listing
All songs written by Colin Hay, except where noted.
"I Haven't Seen You in a Long Time" – 3:19
"Into the Cornfields" – 4:09
"Waiting for My Real Life To Begin" (Hay, Mooney) – 4:57
"Can't Take This Town" – 4:51
"I Think I Know" – 3:59
"Against the Tide" (Clifforth, Hay) – 4:53
"I Don't Miss You Now" – 2:55
"She Put the Blame on You" – 3:48
"Woman's Face" – 5:14
"Lost Generation" (Capek, Hay) – 3:57
"Road to Mandalay" – 3:47
"Ooh, Ooh, Ooh, Ooh Baby" – 4:51
Bonus track on the 2003 German edition
"Overkill (Acoustic version)" – 3:46
Bonus track on the 2009 re-mastered deluxe edition
"Spencer The Rover" – 4:35

Personnel
Colin Hay – acoustic guitar, guitar, bass, electric guitar, vocals, slide guitar
Phil Butson – electric guitar
John Clifforth – acoustic guitar, keyboards
Joe Creighton – bass
Chad Fischer – drums, tambourine
Paul Gadsby – bass
Gerry Hale – fiddle, mandolin
Greg Ham – saxophone
Bruce Haymes – organ, piano
Martin Tillman – cello

Production
Producer: Colin Hay
Mixing: Phil Butson
Engineer: Phil Butson
Mastering: Stephen Marcussen
Engineer: Micajah Ryan
Photography: Isamu Sawa

References 

Colin Hay albums
1994 albums